Kėdainiai railway station is a Lithuanian Railways station in Kėdainiai serving passenger trains.

History 
The main hall of the station was built in 1871, soon after the first section of Libau–Romny Railway line was laid between Kaišiadorys and Liepāja. Regular trains started running on 11 September 1871.

The newly built railway made a significant impact on city's trade development, as it gave access to Vilnius, Šiauliai, Riga, Liepāja, Moscow, as well as other cities in Belarus and Ukraine. It is known that a total of 38,035 kg of cucumbers were transported from the station in 1896. The following year 10 wagons left just to Liepāja.

On 1 August 1944, the building was demolished by retreating Nazis.

References

Railway stations in Lithuania
Buildings and structures in Kėdainiai
Railway stations in the Russian Empire opened in 1871

de:Kėdainiai#Bahnhof Kėdainiai